Parkinsonia microphylla, the yellow paloverde, foothill paloverde or little-leaved palo verde; syn. Cercidium microphyllum), is a species of palo verde.

It is native to the Southwestern United States in southeastern California and southern Arizona; and to northwest Mexico in the states of Sinaloa, Sonora, and Baja California.   The plant is mostly found on slopes, and is one of the most common trees of the Sonoran Desert.

Description
Parkinsonia microphylla is a bristling, upright-branching tree. The species is slow-growing, sometimes living for several hundred years.

The leaves are yellowish green, and during extensively dry and hot periods the tree will shed them.  It has the characteristic of performing photosynthesis in its bark (hence the green color), and this is what allows it to survive leafless in hotter periods.

The flowers are found on the end of a branch, small, pale yellow and occur in late spring. The tree may not flower every year, depending on the amount rainfall. If there is enough rainfall, seeds will also appear in 4–8 cm long, soft pods which dip in between each seed. They ripen in July, and stick to the branches.

The seedlings are very sensitive to drought for the first two to three months of their lives, and only about 1.6% will survive after germinating.
Threats
Buffelgrass is an exotic species of grass native to Africa, first introduced into the Sonoran Desert for livestock grazing, which spreads very quickly and can often kill seedlings by using available water, which could be a threat in the future.

Ecology
It is a honey plant, and its twigs are browsed by wildlife, such as the jackrabbit. In times of scarcity, it may be gnawed by livestock. Rodents will often carry and store the seeds underground, where some of them will germinate after a rainy season.

Uses
The Seri people, a Native American group of northwestern Mexico, call this tree ziipxöl . They grind up the seeds for flour, boil the green pods with meat, and eat the sweet green seeds as well as the flowers. The seeds are also strung to make jewellery.

Cultivation
Parkinsonia microphylla is cultivated as an ornamental tree for use in xeriscapic, modernist, and native plant gardens. It is also used as a small tree in parking lot plantings of commercial developments.

Gallery

References

External links
 
 
 
 Jepson Manual: Parkinsonia microphylla
 

microphylla
Edible legumes
Flora of the Sonoran Deserts
Flora of the California desert regions
Trees of the Southwestern United States
Trees of Baja California
Trees of Sonora
Garden plants of North America
Drought-tolerant trees
Ornamental trees
Flora without expected TNC conservation status